Pimental is a surname. Notable people with the surname include:

 Brian Pimental
 Edward Pimental, American soldier
 José Vizcaíno Pimental, Dominican baseball player
 Nancy Pimental (born 1965), American actress and writer

See also
 Pimenta (disambiguation)
 Pimentel (disambiguation)